John Porter was an American politician who served as U.S. Representative from Pennsylvania from December 8, 1806, to March 4, 1811. He was born in Pennsylvania, but his birth date is unknown. He was elected as a Democratic-Republican to the Ninth United States Congress to fill the vacancy caused by the resignation of Michael Leib. He was then re-elected to the Tenth and Eleventh Congresses.

He was a member of the Pennsylvania State Senate from 1801 to 1805.

References

External links
 Congressional biography

Pennsylvania state senators
19th-century American people
Democratic-Republican Party members of the United States House of Representatives from Pennsylvania
Year of birth missing
Year of death missing